The Time of the Oath is the seventh studio album by German power metal band Helloween, released in 1996.  This is the first album following the death of the original drummer Ingo Schwichtenberg, who was fired from the band after Chameleon and later committed suicide. This album was dedicated in his memory.

Album description
The Time of the Oath is a concept album. According to Andi Deris, it is based on the prophecies of Nostradamus, referring to the prophecies made for the years 1994 to 2000. Nostradamus' interpreters believe that he predicted a third World War followed by a millennium of peace if humans made the right choices. The album is meant to reflect the choices of humanity. The Keeper that appears on this album, having returned from the first two Keeper of the Seven Keys albums and later to return on the third, could represent God, or the stupidity of humanity in the form of the seventh trooper in the song "Before the War." Instead of a space scene as on the cover of Keeper of the Seven Keys Part 1, the area under the Keeper's hood is filled with stars and a line of golden rings, in the fashion of Master of the Rings' artwork. The track "The Time of the Oath" reflects on Act V of Faust Part Two, written by Johann Wolfgang von Goethe. Andi Deris plays the  part of Mephistopheles, reclaiming the soul of doctor Faust, whereas the Choir of the Orchestra "Johann Sebastian Bach", Hamburg, (conducted by Axel Bergstedt) sings the Dies irae from the traditional requiem, representing the angels rescuing Faust's lost soul.

The album contains three singles: "Power", "The Time of the Oath", and "Forever And One (Neverland)". The latter has a different track listing for the German release, which is titled "Forever And One Live".

Track listing

M - 3,4 also appears on "The Time of the Oath" single.
M - 5,6 also appears on the "Power" single.
M - 7,8 also appears on the "Forever and One" single.

Personnel 
 Andi Deris - vocals
 Michael Weikath - lead guitar
 Roland Grapow - rhythm guitar
 Markus Grosskopf - bass
 Uli Kusch - drums

Charts

Certifications

References

Helloween albums
1996 albums
Cultural depictions of Nostradamus